Holbrook Municipal Airport  is a public use airport located  northeast of the central business district of Holbrook, in Navajo County, Arizona, United States. It is owned by the City of Holbrook. This airport is included in the National Plan of Integrated Airport Systems, which categorized it as a general aviation facility.

Facilities and aircraft 
Holbrook Municipal Airport covers an area of 343 acres (139 ha) at an elevation of 5,262 feet (1,604 m) above mean sea level. It has two runways: 3/21 is 6,698 by 75 feet (2,042 x 23 m) with an asphalt surface; 11/29 is 3,202 by 120 feet (976 x 37 m) with a gravel and dirt surface.

For the 12-month period ending April 14, 2011, the airport had 3,630 general aviation aircraft operations, an average of 302 per month. At that time there were 12 aircraft based at this airport: 50% single-engine, 42% ultralight, and 8% multi-engine.

The airport is maintained by the city. There is fuel available for sale, and a pilots' lounge with TV, microwave, and restroom.

Accidents and incidents 

In April 1989, singer-songwriter John Denver was involved in an accident while piloting his 1931 vintage biplane. The plane was taxiing on the airport's runway while attempting to land at Holbrook for refueling on a flight from Carefree, Arizona, to Santa Fe, New Mexico. A wind gust caught the plane, causing it to spin. The plane sustained extensive damage, though Denver was unharmed.

See also 

 List of airports in Arizona

References

External links 
 Holbrook Municipal Airport (P14) at Arizona DOT
 Aerial image as of June 1997 from USGS The National Map
 

Airports in Navajo County, Arizona
Holbrook, Arizona